Meadowbank is a rural locality in the local government area of Central Highlands in the Central region of Tasmania. The 2016 census has a population of 10 for the state suburb of Meadowbank.

History
Meadowbank was gazetted as a locality in 1966. The name was that of a property granted to an early settler.

Geography
The Derwent River forms the eastern boundary. The Meadowbank Dam and Meadowbank Power Station are on this section of the river, and the water impounded by the dam is named Meadowbank Lake.

References

Localities of Central Highlands Council
Towns in Tasmania